The Limestone Coast Rugby League is a rugby league competition held in the Wimmera and South West regions of Victoria and Eastern South Australia. The competition is co-administered by NRL South Australia and NRL Victoria, and features five clubs (three from Victoria and two from South Australia).

History 
The competition was founded in 2017, with four inaugural clubs; the Blue Lake Knights, Horsham Panthers, Naracoorte Jets and Warrnambool Raiders.

The competition was initially dominated by the Naracoorte Jets, who won the first two titles, before Warrnambool broke through for their maiden premiership in 2019.

The competition garnered national attention in 2022 after the ABC News channel ran a series of stories on the Stawell Mounties team which entered the competition for their inaugural season. The side made their way into the Grand Final, where they were defeated 22-8 by the Gunditjmara Bulls.

Clubs 
Five clubs are competing in the 2022 season; Blue Lake (Mount Gambier), Gunditjmara (Warrnambool), Naracoorte, Stawell and Warrnambool.

Former Clubs

Grand Finals 

Source:

References 

Rugby league competitions in Australia 
Rugby league in South Australia 
Rugby league in Victoria (Australia) 
Wimmera